is a female Japanese judoka.

She started judo at the age of 6.

Her favorite technique is Osotogari.

In 2007, she belonged to Komatsu Limited after graduating from Teikyo University.

She has been a shadow of Kaori Matsumoto, who is an Olympic and World champion.

in 2013, she won the gold medal in the -57 kg weight class at Grand Slam Tokyo by defeating olympic bronze medalist Marti Malloy.

In 2014, she won the gold medal in the lightweight (57 kg) division at the 2014 World Judo Championships at the age of 29.

References

External links
 

1985 births
Living people
Komatsu Limited
People from Saijō, Ehime
Japanese female judoka
Universiade medalists in judo
Universiade gold medalists for Japan
Medalists at the 2007 Summer Universiade
21st-century Japanese women